The Italy men's national tennis team represents Italy in Davis Cup tennis competition and are governed by the Federazione Italiana Tennis. Italy won the Davis Cup in 1976, and finished as runners-up six times (1960, 1961, 1977, 1979, 1980, and 1998). They currently compete in the World Group. They last competed in the highest level in 2000, but winning 3–0 against Chile, on September 16, 2011, won again a pass for the World Group. Nicola Pietrangeli is one of Italy's most decorated players, featuring in all major records for the team. He holds the record for most Davis Cup ties, most overall wins, most singles wins, most doubles wins (both individually and as part of a team), and most years played.

History

Early years pre-World War II 
Italy competed in its first Davis Cup in the 1922 International Lawn Tennis Challenge. Prior to World War II (WWII), Italy generally made it to the Quarterfinals of the European Zone and featured in the Inter-zonal final twice – once in 1928 and once in 1930. The Inter-zonal final was the final match of competition before the Challenge Round match, where the winner would earn the right to challenge the defending champion. On both occasions, Italy lost to the United States by a scoreline of 4–1. Uberto De Morpurgo was the Davis Cup captain for both matches and was the only player to register a win in his two single rubbers.

Post World War II – 1962 
Two years after the resumption of the tournament which was put on hold due to WWII, Italy made its first reappearance in 1948. Italy was very strong over this period, appearing in four Inter-zonal finals in 1949, 1952, 1955 and 1958 before finally securing its maiden Challenge Round tie in 1960. Unfortunately, Italy were unable to overcome a strong Australian team featuring Rod Laver and Neale Fraser, losing 4–1 at White City in Sydney. Italian legend, Nicola Pietrangeli managed to win Italy's only point when he defeated Fraser in a dead-rubber match on the final day. The following year, Italy were again able to reach the Challenge Round Final after defeating the United States 4–1 in the Final in Rome. Pietrangeli won both his singles matches and his doubles match. However, Italy would again fall at the final hurdle. On this occasion, Italy lost 5–0 to Australia at Kooyong Stadium in Melbourne. The Australian side would again feature Laver (in singles and doubles) and Fraser (in doubles only), and were joined by Roy Emerson who played two singles matches. The Italian side once again featured Pietrangeli and also Orlando Sirola across all five matches. In 1962, Italy lost in the European Final to Sweden 1–4.

Limited success to first Davis Cup title 
Following a somewhat lean period from 1963 to 1972, which included only one European Final in 1968, Italy returned to form in the competition with mixed success. In 1973 they made a European Final before going one step further the following year, losing 4–1 to South Africa in 1974 in the Inter-zonal Semifinals. Two years later, Italy claimed its maiden Davis Cup title when they defeated Chile 4–1 at Estadio Nacional in Santiago. Italy took an early lead on Day 1, after Corrado Barazzutti and Adriano Panatta both won their singles matches. Then Italy took an unassailable 3–0 lead the following day, when Panatta teamed up with Paolo Bertolucci in the doubles, and after finding themselves one-set-to-love down, won the next three sets to win the rubber in four sets. Over the next four years, Italy would reach the Davis Cup final three times, losing all three ties.

World Group Era (1981–2000) 
Since the World Group format begun in 1981, Italy were able to maintain their top 16 status for twenty years. Italy finished as quarterfinalists or better in twelve of those twenty years, including two semifinal loses and one final loss. In the 2000 Davis Cup, Italy lost 4–1 away to Spain setting them up for World Group Playoff clash against Belgium. Playing at home in Rome, Italy lost the tie 4–1, meaning they would be relegated for the first time in the World Group era.

Relegation and return to World Group 
After Italy's World Group playoff loss, they were relegated to Europe/Africa Zone Group I for the 2001 edition of the tournament. Italy would not return to the World Group until they defeated Chile 4–1 away in the 2011 Davis Cup World Group Play-offs. Between 2013 and 2018, Italy were defeated in the Quarterfinals on four occasions and once in the Semifinals. Since the restructuring of the competition in 2019, Italy has not yet made it into the Semifinals.

Overall performance 
Italy has played no less than 15 semifinals. Italy has recorded eight defeats and seven wins. Of those eight losses, Italy has suffered four whitewash defeats – losing 5–0 to Australia in 1949 and 1955 and the United States in 1952 and 1958. Of the seven semifinals won, the greatest margin was a 4–1 victory, achieved on four occasions. These wins occurred in 1961 and 1998 against the United States, in 1977 against France and in 1979 against Czechoslovakia.

Recent performances
Here is the list of all match-ups since 1981, when the competition started being held in the current World Group format.

2010s

2020s

Current squad

Captains
Although Italy had started its adventure in the Davis Cup back in 1922, it was only in 1928 that the team had its first captain and it was Baron Uberto De Morpurgo, who was also a player on that occasion.

Beginning in the 1950s, the team captain's position became a kind of coach called the non-playing captain.

 Notes
1 Crotta replaced Bergamo as captain after the Semifinals during the 1979 campaign.

Individual and team records

Most ties and wins

Performance timeline 
The Italian team has participated in 91 editions of the Davis Cup since 1922.

Results

Key to eras and positions result 
 Challenge Round era (until 1971): The previous Davis Cup Champion would have a bye to and host the Challenge Round Final. Thus the losing team in the Final (or Inter-zonal final) was the third-placed team. For the purposes of this table, the third placed team is grouped as semifinalists and the Zonal finalists (fourth and fifth placed teams) are grouped as quarterfinalists.
 1972–1980: The previous Davis Cup Champion now had to compete in all rounds. There were four zones consisting of America, Eastern, Europe A and Europe B, with the competition culminating in a four team knockout between zonal winners. The zonal finalists were the equivalent of Davis Cup quarterfinalists.
 Since 1981: World Group (1981–2018), Davis Cup Finals (from 2019) consisting of 16 or 18 teams.
 Abbreviations: POW = Winner of World Group Playoff (1981–2018); POL = Lost in World Group Playoff (1981–2018); GS = Did not advance past the Group Stage of the Davis Cup Finals (from 2019); DNQ = Did not qualify for World Group Playoff

Results table

Notes

See also
 List of Italy Davis Cup team representatives
 Tennis in Italy
 Italy Fed Cup team

References

External links

Davis Cup teams
Davis Cup
Davis Cup